Polyeucte drama by Pierre Corneille 

Polyeucte (opera), Charles Gounod 1878 
Polyeucte, ouverture by Paul Dukas 1891 
Polyeucte,  film  Camille de Morlhon 1910